Paula Richman is an Emerita William H. Danforth Professor of South Asian Religions at Oberlin College. She is an expert in the Tamil language and has edited a series of books about the Ramayana, including Many Ramayanas, Questioning Ramayana, Ramayana Stories in Modern South India and Performing the Ramayana Tradition.

Education
Richman completed her undergraduate degree at Oberlin College in 1974, an MA at Princeton University and the University of Chicago, followed by a PhD at the University of Chicago and a research affiliation with the Tamil Department at the American College in Madurai, India. She began her study of the Ramayana and the Tamil language during her education. She studied Tamil for two years in Coimbatore and Madurai.

Career
Richman was faculty at Swarthmore College, Western Washington University, and Colby College, and then became a member of the faculty at Oberlin College in 1985. In 1997, she was named to the Irvin E. Houck professorship in Humanities for a period of five years. During her career, she traveled to conduct lectures, including to India and Copenhagen.

Richman and her co-editor Rustom Bharucha spent eight years developing the book Performing the Ramayana Tradition: Enactments, Interpretations and Arguments, which includes essays, photographs, interviews, and scripts for theatrical productions, and was published in 2021.

Works

References

Living people
20th-century American academics
21st-century American academics
Oberlin College faculty
Oberlin College alumni
Princeton University alumni
University of Chicago alumni
Swarthmore College faculty
Western Washington University faculty
Colby College faculty
20th-century American women educators
20th-century American educators
21st-century American women educators
21st-century American educators
20th-century American writers
21st-century American writers
20th-century American women writers
21st-century American women writers
Year of birth missing (living people)